Lighthouse Wien is a Vienna, Austria-based non-profit homeless shelter and housing project for homeless persons with substance dependency, HIV/AIDS, hepatitis and/or psychiatric disorders. The project is not subsidized. It was founded in 2003.

Foundation 
The project is based on an idea of Bernhard Durst in the 1990s, supported by television host Günter Tolar, Vienna’s AIDS pastor Clemens Kriz OSsT and a committee of prominent representatives of Austria’s civil society. In view of Lighthouse projects already realized in Hamburg, Basel and Zürich, Vienna should also get a housing project for people with HIV and AIDS. As he died from AIDS in March 1995, Bernhard Durst could not witness the realization of his dream.

The foundation of the first apartment for four inhabitants succeeded in March 2000 in Vienna’s Löwengasse (Lions Street). It was carried out by Friederike Baca, Christian Michelides, Herbert Rausch and the self-help organization Menschen und Aids (Club Plus) [Humans and AIDS], and it was heavily supported with moral encouragement and financial means by Burgl Helbich-Poschacher from the Order of the Maltese.

The main building of the project in Dampfschiffstrasse 8 [Steamboat Street], a five storey residential building in the centre of the city, was rented in May 2001 and was – for the first three years – run in cooperation with Ute Bock, who then gave (and still gives) shelter to asylum seekers. The whole building was then restored according to the needs of the inhabitants. The first apartment, as well as the main Lighthouse building and the additional apartments in the neighbourhood were consecrated by cardinal Christoph Schönborn.

Association
Founded in 2003, the association is chaired by a voluntary board of three members. The first chairwoman was Friederike Baca, followed by chairmen Andreas Hofmann (2005–2008) and Herbert Rausch (since 2008).

The director of the association since its foundation is psychotherapist Christian Michelides. He heads a multiprofessional team consisting of drug counselors, life coaches and psychotherapists, a mediator, a general practitioner, a social worker and a nurse, as well as workers and cleaners, civilian servants and internships.

Lighthouse cooperates with the Pharmacy Feldmarschall Radetzky, with the HIV wards at the Otto-Wagner-Spital (Annenheim) and at the Vienna General Hospital (4-Süd), as well as with the home care association HIV-mobil. Lighthouse participates regularly at the network meeting AIDS-Stammtisch and took part in formulating the requests of the community on the occasion of the XVIII International AIDS Conference, 2010 in Vienna.

Lighthouse has been recognized as a training institution for psychotherapists and clinical psychologists by the Austrian Ministry of Health in 2003.

Support of inhabitants 
Nearly all inhabitants of Lighthouse are heavily traumatized by violence, abuse and tragic family constellations in childhood and youth. Furthermore long years of homelessness, prison and/or prostitution constitute a severe burden. Main targets of the support work are (a) to secure survival and (b) to end criminality and prostitution.

Lighthouse provides social work, psychosocial support, legal advice, care and medical surveillance. Immediately after check-in, drug substitution is made available if recommended by the general practitioner. All inhabitants are procured - if needed - with HIV and Hepatitis treatment as well as psychiatric medication.

The Lighthouse Team has elaborated 12  commandments of stabilisation:
 psychosocial support at the Lighthouse Counter, every day from 8 to 10 a.m.
 support in everyday life hygiene and pest control
 support in household and procurement
 support in answering letters and obtaining official documents
 financial management and procurement of a bank account
 state pensions and financial state support for care
 securing mobility
 support with police fines and in trials
 support in family reunion and regulation of alimony
 support in keeping domestic animals
 psychological evaluation and consulting
 psychotherapy

Lighthouse currently offers shelter and care to 62 formerly homeless persons.

Awards 
 Finalist of the World Habitat Award 2006

References

External links 
 
 Lighthouse in the Plattform Drogentherapien [platform drug therapies]
 Licht in Wiens schwarzes Loch In Wiener Zeitung: WZonlnine, February 14, 2009 [Light into Vienna’s Black Hole]

HIV/AIDS organizations
Charities based in Austria
Homeless shelters in Austria
Community organizations
Drugs in Austria
Organisations based in Vienna
Medical and health organisations based in Austria